Kisolo (also spelled Chisolo) is a traditional mancala game played by the Luba, Lulua and Songye peoples of DR Congo and Zimbabwe. It is closely related to other East African mancalas such as Bao, Bao Kiarabu, Coro and Isolo.

The board used to play Kisolo varies in size depending on common practice and region on the African continent . A board with 32 pits; 4x8 (i.e., 4 rows of 8 pits) is played in the northwestern region of Democratic Republic of Congo. The board in other regions may be is 4x7, i.e., 4 rows of 7 pits each, although there are also Kisolo boards that have 6 pits per row. At game setup, most normally 2 seeds are placed in each pit but some regions start with 3 seeds. Traditionally, seeds from the ngola tree (Pictantus makombo) or the menga tree (Canarium schweinfurtii) are used.

Footnotes

Traditional mancala games
Democratic Republic of the Congo culture
Zimbabwean culture